Turn Off the Light is the debut studio album and second full-length album by German singer Kim Petras. It was released on 1 October 2019 and originally through her own label, BunHead. The album was originally supposed to be released in two volumes, Turn Off the Light, Vol. 1 and Vol. 2 – although it was ultimately released as a full-length studio album comprising the eight songs from the first volume and nine new songs recorded for the second volume.

Turn Off the Light received positive reviews from music critics, who praised its production, lyricism, themes and Petras' vocal performance. On October 23, 2020, Petras announced that she would be releasing a third and final Turn Off the Light volume in October 2021. She shared that the reason for the release date was her desire to perform the songs live for her fans upon release, something she couldn't do if it was released in 2020 due to the ongoing COVID-19 pandemic. "I can't do it if I can't perform it live for you guys, immediately. I have to. It needs to be fresh, and there's a bunch of stuff I want to do to make it really epic." Petras released the single "Party Till I Die" immediately following the announcement of the third installment.

Background
After the release of Turn Off the Light, Vol. 1, Petras initially announced Turn Off the Light, Vol. 2, and even as late as early September 2019, said the follow-up EP would be arriving on 1 October. Instead, on 29 September, Petras announced that she was giving fans "the whole damn story", posting a pre-order link and track list for the compilation album.

Critical reception
Turn Off the Light received positive reviews from music critics, who praised its production, lyricism, themes and Petras' vocal performance. Writing for Billboard, Stephen Daw wrote that the album "maintains the club-infused production of the album's first volume", and pointed out that the tracks "There Will Be Blood", "Wrong Turn" and "Death by Sex" sounded "like Daft Punk deep cuts imbued with demonic synths and blood-curling beats". MTV News Trey Alston noted songs such as "There Will Be Blood", calling the track "an electrifying slice of Petras singing about your demise", alongside "Bloody Valentine", describing the track as an "awesome midnight funk that could get even Frankenstein onto the dance floor", together with "Omen", a "cheery and sinister" song that "sounds like the excitement that vampires get as they stare at exposed necks in the middle of the club".

Writing for Paper magazine, Michael Love Michael praised "Wrong Turn", writing that the "music is appropriately adventurous: a dark, bouncy synthline and Petras' quivering vocal performance keeps momentum going, like victims running from a masked killer". In separate article, Michael said that the newer sounds were "scarier" as they incorporated "familiar sonic tropes like thunder, dramatic organ, haunted children's choirs, mutated screams, and more unexpected sounds, like knives scraping against each other". Idolators Mike Nied gave the album 4.5 out of 5 stars, writing that it was "tailor-made for fans of tightly produced pop bangers and all things fright-inducing".

The song "Party Till I Die" was included on Billboards list of the best LGBTQ songs of 2020.

Track listing

Notes
 "Demons" is stylised as "<demons>".
 "Omen" is stylised as "o m e n" on this album and as "O m E N" on Turn Off the Light, Vol. 1.
 "Transylvania" is stylised as "TRANSylvania".
 "I Don't Wanna Die..." is stylised in sentence case on some platforms and in all lowercase on others.
 "Party Till I Die" was released on October 23, 2020.
 With the release of "Party Till I Die" the styling of songs like "Omen" now reflect their stylization on Vol 1 as opposed to the album stylization.

Charts

Release history

References

2019 albums
Halloween albums
Kim Petras albums
Techno albums by German artists
Dance-pop albums by German artists
Electropop albums
Albums produced by Dr. Luke
Sequel albums